John Waldron is an American politician and educator serving as a member of the Oklahoma House of Representatives from the 77th district. He assumed office on November 16, 2018.

Early life and education 
Waldron is a native of Tulsa, Oklahoma. He attended the University of Virginia from 1986 to 1990, graduating with his Bachelor of Arts degree in international relations. In 1991 he started his master's degree in international relations at George Washington University while working at the School Without Walls in Washington, D.C. He completed his master's in 1995.

Teaching career 
Waldron began his teaching career at the School Without Walls in Washington, D.C. in 1991 and would work there until 1999.
In 1999, he returned to Tulsa and started working as a social studies teacher at Booker T. Washington High School. From 2011 to 2013 he was also the president of the United Nations Association.

Oklahoma House of Representatives
Waldron was elected to the Oklahoma House of Representatives in 2018 and assumed office on November 21, 2018. He has served as the assistant minority floor leader in the House since 2021. In 2023, Waldron filed legislation to increase the pay of school support staff  who make less than $80,000 and by 20 percent.

Electoral history

John Waldron ran unopposed for re-election in 2020.

John Waldron ran unopposed for re-election in 2022.

References

External links
Official house biography

Living people
Politicians from Tulsa, Oklahoma
University of Virginia alumni
George Washington University alumni
Democratic Party members of the Oklahoma House of Representatives
Year of birth missing (living people)
Tulsa Public Schools teachers